Wever, De Wever, or Wevers may refer to:

People

Wever
 Anne-Marie Durand-Wever (1889–1970), German gynecologist
 Clark R. Wever (1835–1874), American Union Civil War brevet brigadier general 
 Elfriede Wever (1900–1941), German Olympic runner
 John M. Wever (1847–1914), US politician
 Margrieta Wever (born 1978), Dutch model and author from Gouda, South Holland
 Merritt Wever (born 1980), US actress
 Ned Wever (1902–1984), American radio and stage actor 
 Robert Wever (fl. 1550s), English poet
 Stefan Wever (born 1958), German baseball player
 Walther Wever (general) (1887–1936), German Luftwaffe Commander
 Walther Wever (pilot) (1923–1945), German Luftwaffe pilot

De Wever
 Bart De Wever (born 1970), Flemish politician
 Frans de Wever (1869–1940), Dutch physician

Wevers
 Jurgen Wevers (born 1979), Dutch footballer
 Lydia Wevers (born 1950), New Zealand literary critic
 Maarten Wevers (born 1952), Dutch-born New Zealand politician
 Paul Wevers (1907–1941), German canoeist

Places
 Wever, Iowa, United States
 Wever (Glabbeek), Glabbeek, Belgium

Other uses
 Willem Wever, a Dutch TV show on NPO Zapp

Dutch words and phrases
Dutch-language surnames
Occupational surnames